The list of shipwrecks in 2015 includes ships sunk, foundered, grounded, or otherwise lost during 2015.

January

1 January

2 January

3 January

4 January

5 January

7 January

8 January

9 January

13 January

14 January

16 January

18 January

20 January

22 January

28 January

31 January

February

2 February

3 February

5 February

6 February

9 February

11 February

17 February

18 February

20 February

22 February

March

4 March

6 March

9 March

11 March

12 March

13 March

14 March

23 March

24 March

27 March

30 March

April

1 April

3 April

4 April

5 April

6 April

8 April

9 April

11 April

15 April

16 April

18 April

19 April

21 April

24 April

26 April

28 April

29 April

May

7 May

8 May

10 May

20 May

21 May

25 May

26 May

30 May

June

1 June

2 June

8 June

  She later turned up at Palembang, Indonesia, safe and unscathed.

9 June

10 June

14 June

18 June

20 June

22 June

24 June

25 June

26 June

29 June

30 June

July

2 July

5 July

6 July

8 July

11 July

13 July

14 July

16 July

17 July

19 July

20 July

21 July

22 July

23 July

26 July

31 July

August

7 August

8 August

11 August

12 August

15 August

20 August

21 August

24 August

25 August

27 August

September

2 September

3 September

5 September

10 September

12 September

22 September

27 September

28 September

30 September

October

1 October

4 October

5 October

6 October

11 October

17 October

19 October

21 October

23 October

25 October

30 October

Unknown date

November

1 November

2 November

8 November

14 November

16 November

18 November

20 November

21 November

22 November

24 November

28 November

30 November

December

4 December

10 December

11 December

13 December

14 December

16 December

17 December

19 December

22 December

27 December

References

2015
 
Shipwrecks